United 93 is a 2006 docudrama thriller film written and directed by Paul Greengrass. The film chronicles the events aboard United Airlines Flight 93, one of the four hijacked flights during the September 11 attacks and the only one not to hit its intended target due to the intervention of passengers and crew.

The film attempts to recount the hijacking and subsequent events in the flight with as much veracity as possible (there is a disclaimer that some imagination had to be used) and in real time (from the flight's takeoff). The film was made with the cooperation of many of the passengers' families, though not all agreed to participate.

United 93 premiered on April 26, 2006, at the Tribeca Film Festival in New York City, a festival founded to celebrate New York City as a major filmmaking center and to contribute towards the long-term recovery of Lower Manhattan. Several family members of the passengers aboard the flight attended the premiere to show their support.

The film opened in North America on April 28, 2006, to critical acclaim. Ten percent of the gross income from the three-day opening weekend was promised toward a donation to create a memorial for the flight's victims. The total gross intake of United 93 was $31.4 million in the United States, and $76.3 million worldwide. The film also received two Academy Award nominations, including Best Director for Greengrass.

Plot 

On the morning of September 11, 2001, four al-Qaeda members, Ziad Jarrah, Saeed al-Ghamdi, Ahmed al-Nami and Ahmed al-Haznawi pray in a Newark, New Jersey hotel, and after Jarrah makes a final phone call to his girlfriend, board United Airlines Flight 93, piloted by Captain Jason Dahl and First Officer LeRoy Homer Jr., at Newark International Airport. Among the passengers are Tom Burnett, Todd Beamer, Jeremy Glick,  Richard Guadagno, Louis J. Nacke II, Lauren Grandcolas and Mark Bingham who is the last passenger to board, barely making the flight. United 93 becomes delayed due to airport traffic. Air traffic controllers lose contact with American Airlines Flight 11 which diverts toward New York City and realise it has been hijacked after hearing suspicious transmissions. Shortly after United 93 takes off after its slight delay, Flight 11 crashes into the North Tower of the World Trade Center, and United Airlines Flight 175 is also hijacked and heads toward New York City. Air traffic controllers learn that American Airlines Flight 77 has also been hijacked and watch in horror as United 175 crashes into the South Tower.

As the passengers are served breakfast on United 93, Jarrah hesitates to start the hijacking. Via an ACARS message, Dahl and Homer are notified of the WTC attacks and to beware cockpit intrusion. After Nami unsuccessfully urges Jarrah to attack, an impatient Haznawi prepares an artificial bomb in the lavatory. Ghamdi grabs flight attendant Deborah Welsh at knife point and passenger Mark Rothenberg is mortally wounded by Haznawi. As Haznawi and Nami force the passengers to the back of the plane, Ghamdi kills both pilots, despite sending out a mayday call, and Welsh, as Jarrah begins piloting the aircraft, and redirects it towards Washington, D.C., with the intention to crash it into the United States Capitol. Grandcolas (an emergency medical technician) tries to help the dying Rothenberg but Nami berates her. The hijackers jubilantly react to the success of the WTC attack. While flight attendants Sandra Bradshaw and CeeCee Lyles unsuccessfully attempt to revive Rothenberg, Bradshaw sees the hijackers moving the bodies of the pilots and Welsh and the passengers overhear this.

After Flight 77 crashes into The Pentagon, FAA National Operations Manager Ben Sliney decides to shut down all U.S. air space and ground all flights. Passengers on United 93 learn of the other attacks from family members via airphone. Realising the hijackers have no intention of landing, Burnett, Bingham, Beamer, Glick (a former judo champion), Guadagno and Nacke form a plan to retake the plane, with assistance from flight staff, arming themselves with weapons, and learn passenger Donald Greene is a licensed pilot and passenger Andrew Garcia is a former air traffic controller. As the group gather, Haznawi and Nami anxiously realise they are losing control and Jarrah and Ghamdi become agitated, as they are twenty minutes away from D.C. and are unable to speed up to reach their target. Passenger Christian Adams, attempting to counsel appeasement, is restrained by some of the passengers, while other passengers pray and make final calls to loved ones.

After Beamer urges the group to take action, the passengers charge a stunned Haznawi, tackle him and beat him. As Nami, Ghamdi and Jarrah panic, Bingham defeats Haznawi by bashing his skull in with a fire extinguisher and Nacke declares the bomb a fake. As Grandcolas, passengers William Cashman, Patrick Driscoll and Alan Beaven join the assault, Jarrah violently rocks the plane to disrupt the assault and Nami tries to hold them off with a serving cart, Mace and his own fire extinguisher. He too is subdued, and Glick gouges his eyes out before snapping his neck. As the group move Greene and Garcia though first-class, the passengers reach the cockpit door. Jarrah and Ghamdi are disheartened by the realisation that they will never reach their target, and debate on whether to crash the plane rather than cede control. The passengers breach the cockpit with the cart just as Jarrah puts the plane into a steep dive, reciting the takbir. Ghamdi tries to protect Jarrah, but the passengers overpower him and wrestle Jarrah for control. The aircraft inverts and crashes into a Shanksville field, killing everyone aboard.

The film ends with a series of title cards explaining that of the four airliners hijacked on September 11, 2001, United 93 was the only one that did not reach its intended target. This is followed by a dedication to all who lost their lives in the attacks.

Cast 

 Christian Clemenson as Tom Burnett
 Cheyenne Jackson as Mark Bingham
 David Alan Basche as Todd Beamer
 Peter Hermann as Jeremy Glick
 Corey Johnson as Louis J. Nacke, II
 Daniel Sauli as Richard Guadagno
 Trish Gates as Sandra Bradshaw
 Richard Bekins as William Joseph Cashman
 Michael J. Reynolds as Patrick Joseph Driscoll
 Khalid Abdalla as Ziad Jarrah
 Lewis Alsamari as Saeed al-Ghamdi
 Jamie Harding as Ahmed al-Nami
 Omar Berdouni as Ahmed al-Haznawi
 Opal Alladin as CeeCee Lyles
 Nancy McDoniel as Lorraine G. Bay
 Peter Marinker as Andrew Garcia
 David Rasche as Donald Freeman Greene
 J. J. Johnson as Captain Jason Dahl
 Gary Commock as First Officer LeRoy Homer Jr.
 Polly Adams as Deborah Welsh
 Chip Zien as Mark Rothenberg
 Erich Redman as Christian Adams
 Kate Jennings Grant as Lauren Grandcolas
 Starla Benford as Wanda Anita Green
 Simon Poland as Alan Anthony Beaven
 Trieste Kelly Dunn as Deora Frances Bodley
 Jodie Lynne McClintock as Marion R. Britton
 Marceline Hugot as Georgine Rose Corrigan
 Rebecca Schull as Patricia Cushing
 Ray Charleson as Joseph DeLuca
 Tom O'Rourke as Donald Peterson
 Becky London as Jean Headley Peterson
 John Rothman as Edward P. Felt
 Libby Morris as Hilda Marcin
 Denny Dillon as Colleen Fraser
 Susan Blommaert as Jane Folger
 Tara Hugo as Kristin White Gould
 Lorna Dallas as Linda Gronlund
 Masato Kamo as 
 Liza Colón-Zayas as Waleska Martinez
 Olivia Thirlby as Nicole Carol Miller
 Leigh Zimmerman as Christine Snyder
 Joe Jamrog as John Talignani
 Chloe Sirene as Honor Elizabeth Wainio
 Patrick St. Esprit as Major Kevin Nasypany
 John Kaplun as NY controller
Throughout the film, Ben Sliney portrays himself.

Production
The film was the first Hollywood feature to draw its narrative directly from the September 11 attacks of 2001. Passengers were portrayed in the film mostly by professional but relatively unknown actors. (Tom Burnett, for instance, is played by Christian Clemenson, who has since appeared on Boston Legal and CSI: Miami). Additionally, several participants in the real-life events portray themselves in the film, including Thomas Roberts, Tobin Miller, Rich Sullivan, Tony Smith, James Fox, Shawna Fox, Jeremy Powell, Curt Applegate, Greg Callahan, Rick Tepper, and notably FAA operations manager Ben Sliney. Sliney was initially involved in the film in an advisory role. He was then cast in a small role as an air traffic controller. Later, Greengrass offered him the opportunity to play himself, which he accepted. The roles of one of the flight attendants, the two pilots, and many other airline personnel were filled by actual airline employees.

During production, the actors playing the crew and the passengers of the flight were put in separate hotels from the actors portraying the hijackers and ate their meals separately, ostensibly to create an air of antagonism in the film between the two groups. The set itself was built so that it moved the way the actual flight did. During the filming, many of the actors actually got injured, and the blood visible on their faces during the revolt scene is authentic.

Filming took place from October until December 2005, on a 20-year-old reclaimed Boeing 757 formerly operated by MyTravel Airways, at Pinewood Studios near London. The cockpit was built by Flightdeck Solutions. The location was chosen both for its financial incentives and to shield actors from unwanted public scrutiny they might have received in the United States. Action was filmed with handheld cameras, chosen for their versatility on the close-quarters sets and to create a sense of immediacy. Exterior airport sequences were shot on location at Newark Liberty International Airport, while interiors were shot back in England at London Stansted Airport. A few scenes were also shot in Washington, D.C. and Boston. Additionally, an opening sequence set in Afghanistan was shot in Morocco, but it was cut from the film before release.

During the scene where Nami is killed by the passengers in the revolt, he is shown crying. Finishing the very first take, Jamie Harding, who plays Nami, became overwhelmed that he was sobbing. In this scene, the sobbing Nami makes as Glick holds him around the head and throat and twists, breaking his neck, is authentic and not acted.

The film was given an R rating by the Motion Picture Association of America for "language, and some intense sequences of terror and violence".  The film was released in the United States on April 28, 2006, and opened second in the weekend box office behind RV, but it netted a slightly higher per-screen average.

Initial screenings ended with the closing credits line "America's War on Terror had begun". This was replaced in the release version with "Dedicated to the memory of all those who lost their lives on September 11, 2001".

There were calls for Universal to pull the film's trailers from circulation in cinemas, due to some audience members feeling startled or upset by the film's subject matter. The studio did not heed that call, although one theatre in Manhattan voluntarily pulled the trailer after audience complaints.

The Iraqi-born, London-based actor Lewis Alsamari, who plays Ghamdi, was reportedly denied a visa by United States immigration authorities when he applied to visit New York City to attend the premiere, despite having already been granted asylum in the United Kingdom since the 1990s. The reason reported to have been given was that he had once been a conscripted member of the Iraqi Army — although this was also the grounds for his refugee status after his desertion in 1993. Other sources say that he applied late for his visa and that it was not denied.

Historical accuracy 

The timing of the events is changed for dramatic effect, with Jarrah making his final call to his girlfriend from the airport, whereas he did it from his hotel room, and Mohamed Atta's  transmission being determined before Flight 11 crashed into the WTC; it actually happened after. In a interview, Ben Sliney said that Greengrass exaggerated other details for dramatic effect, such as him and various controllers swearing and shouting when in his recollection most people spoke quietly.

The film suggests explanations for why the hijackers waited 46 minutes after takeoff to start the hijacking, portraying Jarrah as hesitant and doubtful, to the dismay of his fellow hijackers. The hijackers' intended target is unknown, but the film follows a common assumption that it was the United States Capitol in Washington, D.C.

The cockpit voice recorder tape from United Flight 93 has never been made public; however, a transcript was made public after the film was completed, shedding more light on what actually happened in the final 30 minutes before the plane crashed. Some parts contradict the filmmakers' choices in terms of some dialogue and specific aspects of the event. For example, the pilots, Jason Dahl and LeRoy Homer Jr., are shown in the film being killed immediately during the hijacking. This was based on documentary evidence from the 9/11 Commission Report which indicates that at least one passenger reported in a cell phone call seeing two people, possibly the pilots, lying dead or injured on the floor outside the cockpit after the hijacking.  Though Dahl is shown sending out the mayday call, Melody Homer claimed to recognise her husband as the voice of the mayday hailer. Due to the then forthcoming Zacarias Moussaoui trial, Jason Dahl's wife Sandy Dahl was unable to tell the film's director, Paul Greengrass, what she believed really happened regarding her husband. Some statements made by the terrorists in the cockpit voice recorder transcript, as well as moans heard in the background inside the cockpit, raised doubts that both pilots were dead before the plane crashed. Both Sandy Dahl and Melody Homer criticized the film for not focusing on the flight crew’s actions and ignoring their beliefs their husbands tried to interfere with the autopilot.<ref name=Guardian>Vulliamy, Ed (May 27, 2006). [https://www.theguardian.com/film/2006/may/27/features.weekend "For ONE moment it was possible to dream that the ending would be different'...'"]. The Guardian.</ref>

There is some controversy between some of the family members of the passengers and the investigative officials as to whether the passengers managed to breach the cockpit before the plane crashed. The 9/11 Commission Report concluded that "the hijackers remained at the controls but must have judged that the passengers were only seconds from overcoming them". However, many of the passengers' family members, having heard the audio recordings, believe that the passengers did breach the cockpit and struggled with the hijackers for control of the yoke.

Portrayal of Christian Adams
The film has been criticized for its portrayal of German passenger Christian Adams, who is portrayed as counseling appeasement, to the point the passengers restrain him when he tries to warn the hijackers, despite the absence of any evidence that he did so. It was also reported that Adams's widow did not cooperate with the filmmakers due to the emotional pain. Sunday Times critic Cosmo Landesman mused, "Surely one of the passengers didn't phone home to point out that there was a cowardly German on board who wanted to give in?" Critic John Harris suggested in a Guardian blog, "there will surely be all kinds of cries about old European surrender monkeys, the United States' contrasting backbone etc.""United 93 actor defends portrayal". BBC.co.uk. Erich Redman, who portrayed Adams in the film, has stated he did not intend to portray Adams as cowardly but as a man who "never made rash decisions and everything he did was always well-considered".

 Reception 

 Critical response United 93 was one of the most critically acclaimed films of 2006. James Berardinelli, Roger Ebert, Michael Medved, and Peter Travers  all awarded it full marks on their rating scales, with Ebert calling the film "masterful and heartbreaking" and saying that it "does honor to the memory of the victims". Travers termed it "one of the most moving films of the year", in Rolling Stone. Calling it "gut-wrenching and surprisingly probative," The A.V. Club includes it on a list of "Great Films Too Painful To Watch Twice."

The film has a score of 90 on Metacritic, where it appears on 39 critics' top 10 lists, more than any other 2006 film on the site, (although the 2006 film with the highest average score on the site is the re-released 1969 film Army of Shadows).http://www.avmaroc.com/videos/united+airlines-cLiPUfHP1_DIie0.html The film was ranked #1 on 47 lists (the most of any 2006 film).

At the website Movie City News, which ranks 250 critics' lists and awards points for list-placement, United 93 ranks as the number one film of 2006 with a score of 917.5 points.

The film has been cited as a favorite by filmmaker John Waters, who presented it as his annual selection at the 2010 Maryland Film Festival.

 Top 10 lists 
Only two films (The Departed and The Queen) appeared on more top 10 lists of the best films of 2006 than United 93, and no film received more #1 mentions:

1st – Empire1st – J. R. Jones, Chicago Reader1st – Kyle Smith, New York Post1st – Lawrence Toppman, The Charlotte Observer1st – Michael Rechtshaffen, The Hollywood Reporter1st – Michael Sragow, The Baltimore Sun1st – Mike Russell, The Oregonian1st – Noel Murray, The A.V. Club
2nd – Claudia Puig, USA Today2nd – James Berardinelli, ReelViews
2nd – Marc Mohan, The Oregonian2nd – Michael Phillips, Chicago Tribune2nd – Nathan Rabin, The A.V. Club
2nd – Owen Gleiberman, Entertainment Weekly2nd – Shawn Levy, The Oregonian2nd – Sheri Linden, The Hollywood Reporter2nd – Joshua Rothkopf, Time Out New York2nd – Staff, Film Threat3rd – Ann Hornaday, The Washington Post3rd – Desson Thomson, The Washington Post3rd – Marjorie Baumgarten, The Austin Chronicle3rd – Scott Foundas, LA Weekly3rd – Scott Tobias, The A.V. Club
3rd – Ty Burr, The Boston Globe4th – Kirk Honeycutt, The Hollywood Reporter4th – Rene Rodriguez, The Miami Herald4th – Richard Corliss, TIME magazine
4th – Tasha Robinson, The A.V. Club
5th – Frank Scheck, The Hollywood Reporter5th – Keith Phipps, The A.V. Club
6th – Roger Ebert, Chicago Sun-Times6th – Peter Travers, Rolling Stone6th – Stephen Holden, The New York Times8th – Dennis Harvey, Variety8th – Kevin Smith
8th – Lou Lumenick, New York Post8th – Marc Savlov, The Austin Chronicle8th – Ray Bennett, The Hollywood Reporter9th – William Arnold, Seattle Post-IntelligencerJoe Morgenstern of The Wall Street Journal and Steven Rea of The Philadelphia Inquirer named it among the top ten best films of 2006.

 Accolades United 93 received numerous awards and nominations from film critics and guilds. Ultimately, the film received two Academy Award nominations, including Best Director, at the 79th Academy Awards, and six BAFTA Award nominations, including Best British Film, at the 60th British Academy Film Awards, winning two for Best Director and Best Film Editing.

 Home media United 93 was released to DVD on September 5, 2006, in both widescreen and full screen. Also released was a 2-disc Special Limited Edition in widescreen. A Blu-ray Disc version was released on September 6, 2011. A second Blu-ray release from Universal Studios for the film was released on June 5, 2012, as a part of Universal's Universal 100th Anniversary releases. This version included the same Blu-ray Disc (same transfer and same bonus features) found in the first 2011 release in addition to a DVD and digital copy included in the pack with a brand-new sleeve that was not available with the previous release. Both Blu-ray Disc sets for the film are region-free.

 See also 
 List of cultural references to the September 11 attacks
 United 300''
 World Trade Center (film)

References

Further reading

External links 

 
 
 
 
 
 United 93 at ReelFaces
 
 Investigating United 93: Researching and Honoring a Catastrophe: Part I  by Uri Lessing
 Investigating United 93: Researching and Honoring a Catastrophe: Part II  by Uri Lessing
 Interview with Andrew Bernstein
 German 9/11 Victim Defamed in United 93  – review focusing on the stereotyping and politics
 Hijacking the Hijacking, the problem with the United 93 films by Ron Rosenbaum, on Slate.com

2006 films
2000s biographical films
2000s disaster films
2006 thriller drama films
American aviation films
American biographical drama films
American disaster films
American thriller drama films
BAFTA winners (films)
British aviation films
British biographical drama films
British disaster films
British thriller drama films
American docudrama films
Drama films based on actual events
English-language French films
Films based on the September 11 attacks
Films directed by Paul Greengrass
Films produced by Eric Fellner
Films produced by Tim Bevan
Films scored by John Powell
Films set in New Jersey
Films shot at Pinewood Studios
Films shot in Boston
Films shot in Essex
Films shot in Morocco
Films shot in Newark, New Jersey
Films shot in Washington, D.C.
Films whose director won the Best Direction BAFTA Award
French biographical drama films
French disaster films
French aviation films
French thriller drama films
Sidney Kimmel Entertainment films
StudioCanal films
Thriller films based on actual events
United Airlines Flight 93
Universal Pictures films
Working Title Films films
Films set in Virginia
Films set on airplanes
2006 drama films
Films set in New York City
Films set in Boston
Films set in 2001
Films set in Pennsylvania
2000s American films
2000s British films
2000s French films